The 1970 Kansas Jayhawks football team represented the University of Kansas in the Big Eight Conference during the 1970 NCAA University Division football season. In their fourth and final season under head coach Pepper Rodgers, the Jayhawks compiled a 5–6 record (2–5 against conference opponents), tied for sixth place in the Big Eight Conference, and were outscored by their opponents by a combined total of 277 to 270. They played their home games at Memorial Stadium in Lawrence, Kansas, where artificial turf was installed. 

The team's statistical leaders included Dan Heck with 1,169 passing yards, John Riggins with 1,131 rushing yards and Ron Jessie with 308 receiving yards. Larry Brown was the team captain.

Schedule

Roster

1971 NFL Draft

References

Kansas
Kansas Jayhawks football seasons
Kansas Jayhawks football